The Netherlands competed at the 1932 Summer Olympics in Los Angeles, United States. 45 competitors, 31 men and 14 women, took part in 29 events in 9 sports.

Medalists

Gold
 Jacques van Egmond — Cycling, Men's 1000m Sprint (Scratch)
 Charles Pahud de Mortanges — Equestrian, Three-Day Event Individual Competition

Silver
 Jacques van Egmond — Cycling, Men's 1000m Time Trial
 Aernout van Lennep, Karel Schummelketel, and Charles Pahud de Mortanges — Equestrian, Three-Day Event Team Competition
 Willy den Ouden — Swimming, Women's 100m Freestyle
 Corrie Laddé, Willy den Ouden, Puck Oversloot, and Marie Vierdag — Swimming, Women's 4 × 100 m Freestyle Relay
 Bob Maas — Sailing, Men's Monotype Class

Athletics

Cycling

Two cyclists, both men, represented the Netherlands in 1932.

Sprint
 Jacobus van Egmond

Time trial
 Jacobus van Egmond

Tandem
 Bernard Leene
 Jacobus van Egmond

Equestrian

Fencing

Two fencers, one man and one woman, represented the Netherlands in 1932.

Men's foil
 Doris de Jong

Men's épée
 Doris de Jong

Men's sabre
 Doris de Jong

Women's foil
 Jo de Boer

Modern pentathlon

One male pentathlete represented the Netherlands in 1932.

 Willem van Rhijn

Rowing

Sailing

Swimming

Art competitions

References

External links
Official Olympic Reports
International Olympic Committee results database

Nations at the 1932 Summer Olympics
1932
Olympics